Trunk Networks is a British internet service provider (ISP) and cloud service provider based in Uckfield, offering business and residential broadband and VoIP services, amongst others. The company was founded in 2008 as the result of a merger between a virtual ISP and an IT support company.

They provide Fibre to the Premises (FTTP) broadband services and VoIP telephone services over the Openreach and CityFibre networks.

References

External links
 

Internet service providers of the United Kingdom
Telecommunications companies of the United Kingdom
VoIP services
Companies based in Sussex
Telecommunications companies established in 2006
2006 establishments in England